A Million to Burn is a 1923 American comedy film directed by William Parke and written by Raymond L. Schrock. The film stars Herbert Rawlinson, Kalla Pasha, Beatrice Burnham, Tom McGuire, Melbourne MacDowell and Margaret Landis. The film was released on October 26, 1923, by Universal Pictures.

Cast          
Herbert Rawlinson as Thomas Gwynne
Kalla Pasha as Nickoli Rubnov
Beatrice Burnham as Daisy Jones
Tom McGuire as P.D. Riley
Melbourne MacDowell as Mark Mills
Margaret Landis as Sybil Mills
George F. Marion as Old Ben Marlowe
Fred R. Stanton as Langden 
Frederick Bertrand as The Auditor

Preservation
The film is now considered lost.

References

External links
 

1923 films
1920s English-language films
Silent American comedy films
1923 comedy films
Universal Pictures films
American silent feature films
American black-and-white films
Films directed by William Parke
Lost American films
1923 lost films
Lost comedy films
1920s American films